Addison is a Scottish patronymic surname meaning "son of Addie", a Scottish Lowlands nickname for Adam.

Notable people with the surname "Addison" include

A
Aaron Addison (born 1995), Australian tennis player
Adele Addison (born 1925), American soprano
Agnes Addison (1842–1903), New Zealand draper
Albert Christopher Addison (1862–1935), English writer
Alexander Addison (disambiguation), multiple people
Alwin Addison (1887–1971), Australian cricketer
Angela Addison (born 1999), English footballer
Anita W. Addison (1952–2004), American film director
Arthur Addison (1842–1915), Australian politician

B
Ben Addison (born 1985), Scottish rugby union footballer
Benjamin N. O. Addison, Ghanaian politician
Bernard Addison (1905–1990), American guitarist
Bishara Addison, American politician
Bob Addison (1908–1988), Australian rules footballer
Bralon Addison (born 1993), American football player

C
Calen Addison (born 2000), Canadian ice hockey player
Carlotta Addison (1849–1914), English actress
Charles G. Addison (1812–1866), English barrister
Chris Addison (born 1971), English comedian
Christopher Addison, 1st Viscount Addison (1869–1951), British politician
Christopher Addison, 2nd Viscount Addison (1904–1976), British politician
Cliff Addison (1913–1994), British chemist
Colin Addison (born 1940), English footballer
Corran Addison (born 1969), South African canoeist

D
Daniel Dulany Addison (1863–1936), American clergyman and writer
Derek Addison (born 1955), Scottish footballer
Dylan Addison (born 1987), Australian rules football player

E
Edward Addison (1898–1987), English Air Force commander
Ernest Addison (born 1963), Ghanaian economist

F
Fanny Addison (1844–1937), English actress

G
George Addison (disambiguation), multiple people
Gulston Addison (1673–1709), British politician

H
Harry W. Addison (1920–2003), American author and humorist
Henry Addison (disambiguation), multiple people

J
Jackie Addison (born 1962), American politician
James Thayer Addison (1887–1953), American priest
Jane Addison (1771–1851), English social figure
Jim Addison (1884–1957), Australian rules footballer
John Addison (disambiguation), multiple people
Jonathan Addison (born 1965), English cricketer
Jordan Addison (born 2002), American football player
Joseph Addison (disambiguation), multiple people
Juliana Addison (born 1974), Australian politician

K
Karen Addison (born 1970), Scottish curler
Kodwo Addison (1927–1985), Ghanaian politician

L
Lancelot Addison (1632–1703), English priest
Lancelot Addison (Archdeacon of Dorset) (??–1955), English priest
Laura Addison (1822–1852), English actress
Leonard Addison (1902–1975), British diplomat
Linda Addison (disambiguation), multiple people
Lily Addison (1885–1982), Australian tennis player
Lily Isabel Maude Addison (1885–1968), Australian architect
Lucy Addison (1861–1937), American teacher

M
Margaret Addison (1868–1940), Canadian educator
Mario Addison (born 1987), American football player
Michael Addison (disambiguation), multiple people
Miles Addison (born 1989), English football player

N
Nancy Addison (1946–2002), American actress

P
Paul Addison (1943–2020), British author and historian
Percy Addison (1875–1952), English admiral

R
Rafael Addison (born 1964), American basketball player
Rex Addison, Australian architect
Robert Addison (1754–1829), English bishop
Robyn Addison (born 1984), British actress
Roger Addison (1945–2010), Welsh rugby union player
Roy Addison (born 1939), British boxer

S
Shari Addison (born 1962), American musician
Susan Addison (born 1955), English trombonist

T
Terry Addison (born 1946), Australian tennis player
Thomas Addison (1793–1860), English doctor
Tom Addison (1936–2011), American football player
Tom Addison (baseball), American baseball player

W
Walter Addison (disambiguation), multiple people
Will Addison (born 1992), English rugby union footballer
William Addison (disambiguation), multiple people

See also
Addison (disambiguation), a disambiguation page for "Addison"
Addison (given name), a page for people with the given name "Addison"
Viscount Addison (disambiguation), a disambiguation page for Viscounts surnamed "Addison"

References 

Patronymic surnames
Surnames of Lowland Scottish origin
Given names originating from a surname